Neotraditional may refer to:

Neotraditional country, a style of country music
New Classical Architecture, an architecture movement
New Urbanism, an urban design movement
Traditionalist School (perennialism)
Islamic neo-traditionalism

See also
Traditionalism (disambiguation)
New Tradition (disambiguation)